Dreaming is a 1944 German historical musical drama film directed by Harald Braun and starring Hilde Krahl, Mathias Wieman and Friedrich Kayssler. It portrays the lives of the pianist Clara Schumann and her composer husband Robert Schumann.

It was shot at the Babelsberg and Tempelhof Studios in Berlin and on location around Xanten in the Rhineland. The film's sets were designed by the art directors Emil Hasler and Walter Kutz. Considered an important national film the production received financial assistance from the government, and had a total budget of over two million reichsmarks. It premiered in Zwickau, the birthplace of Robert Schumann, two days before it was first screened at the Marmorhaus cinema in the capital.
Originally, the film was going to star Zarah Leander as Clara Schumann, and movie posters featuring her were even distributed. However, Leander fled to Sweden, due to the ongoing war, and was recast.

The future star Hildegard Knef shot some scenes, which would have marked her film debut, but these were left out of the final cut.

Cast

References

Bibliography

External links

1944 films
1940s musical drama films
1940s biographical drama films
1940s historical musical films
German musical drama films
German biographical drama films
German historical musical films
Films of Nazi Germany
1940s German-language films
Films directed by Harald Braun
Biographical films about musicians
Films about classical music and musicians
Films about composers
Films about pianos and pianists
Films set in the 1830s
Films set in the 1840s
Films set in the 1850s
Films set in Düsseldorf
UFA GmbH films
Films shot at Tempelhof Studios
Films shot at Babelsberg Studios
Robert Schumann
German black-and-white films
1944 drama films
1940s German films